John James Huddart (1856–1930), known usually as John J. Huddart, was a British born and trained architect who practised out of Denver, Colorado in the United States.  At the end of the Nineteenth century he was one of Denver's leading architects, known for his work on public buildings and as a courthouse architect. His practice lasted from 1882 to 1930 and commissions included Charles Boettcher House in Denver, Colorado's Fort Morgan State Armory, Denver's Filbeck Building, and six of Colorado's county courthouses.

He worked for the Catholic Church's Denver Archdiocese designing Denver's St. Thomas Theological Seminary and the Hotel St. Nicholas (1898), dedicated as a general hospital to serve Cripple Creek, Colorado and the surrounding area during the height of the 1890s gold rush. His original architectural drawings for the Hotel St. Nicholas (drawn in 1896) are displayed in the hotel's main lobby of the Cripple Creek Hotel. He also designed Murchison School (1902) in South Carolina. He designed the El Cortez Apartments at 608 East 12th Avenue in Denver Colorado 80203.

Huddart is known for his Classical Revival and Richardsonian Romanesque style designs. A retrospective of his work, Architecture of John J. Huddart, Architect  was published in 1907 and included his work in Colorado cities; Salt Lake City, Utah; Alva, Oklahoma; Rawlins, Wyoming; and Bennettsville, South Carolina. His practice lasted from 1882 to 1930 and commissions included Charles Boettcher House in Denver, Colorado's Fort Morgan State Armory, Denver's Filbeck Building, and six of Colorado's county courthouses.

Early years
Huddart was born in Preston, Lancashire, England on 25 August 1856. He received his advanced education at Alston College in England, graduating at 19. He apprenticed at J.C. Fill & Co. and with Hayward Tyler Engineering Co. before moving to Pernambuco, Brazil in South America to design a sugar refinery. He then emigrated to Jacksonville, Florida, and before moving on to Denver within the same year (1882).

In Denver he worked as chief draftsman Frank Edbrooke's office from 1882 until
1887, when he established his own practice. Huddart created a standard armoury design in the early 1920s and it was used for the construction of twelve armoury buildings across Colorado.

Courthouse work

His work on courthouses began in 1905 with the Adams County Courthouse in Brighton, Colorado and continued with the Cheyenne County Courthouse (1908), listed on the National Register of Historic Places; the Washington County Courthouse (1908–10); Logan County Courthouse (1908–10), listed on the National Register of Historic Places; Summit County Courthouse (1909); Saguache County Courthouse (1910) listed on the Colorado Register of Historic Places; and the Elbert County Courthouse in 1912, as well as two final courthouse projects late in his career: Lincoln County Courthouse (1923) and Custer County Courthouse (1929).

He also designed the Deuel County Courthouse and the Garden County Courthouse in Nebraska.

Other works

His work in Denver includes:
 Essex Building (1887, demolished)
 Bank Block (1889, demolished)
 Gold Mining Stock Exchange (1896) in Cripple Creek, Colorado
 American National Bank Building (1901) in Leadville, Colorado

He is also credited with designing:
 Creswell Mansion (1889), listed on the National Register of Historic Places
 Kinneavy Terrace (1889–90)
 Carnegie Library in Monte Vista (1919), listed on the National Register of Historic Places
 Colorado State Armory in Craig (1922), listed on the National of Historic Places.

Additional buildings:
Essex Building (Frank E. Edbrooke also credited with design) 1617 Lawrence St. in Denver (1887) Demolished.
Bank Block Denver (1889) Demolished
Creswell Mansion 1244 Grant St., Denver (1889) NRHP Listed
 Gilmore House at 2401 Emerson St. in Denver (1889)
 Unnamed Terrace 2502-04 Clarkson St., Denver (1889)
 Unnamed House 1347 Williams St. in Denver (1889) Demolished
 Big Chief Bottling Co. 1539 Platte. St., Denver 5DV536 1889–90 
 Kinneavy Terrace 2700 Stout St., Denver 5DV103 (1889–90) in the Curtis Park Historic District
 Athelston Apartments Denver 1890 Demolished
 Huddart Terrace 625 E. 16th St., Denver 1890 (Denver Local Landmark)
 Armstrong House (with Jacobson) 2707 Humboldt St., Denver 5DV6997 1890
 Gross Barney Supply (with Jackson? Jacobson?) 1612 Wazee St., Denver
 Cole Lydon House 2418 Stout St., Denver 5DV103.15 1890 in the Curtis Park Historic District
 Swift Building in Pueblo (1890)
 Unnamed House at 1374 Race St., Denver 1890 Demolished
 Unnamed House at 1400 Gilpin St., Denver 1890 Wyman
 Stanley School 1301 Quebec St. in Denver (1891)
 Kittredge Castle/Holland Hall at 8 & 9th Aves. And Olive and Oneida Sts (1891) Demolished
 Horwitz Building (addition to (1891) building; rebuilt in 1892 following fire) 1630 Blake St. in Denver 5DV47.25 (1891) in Lower Downtown Certified Historic District
 Unnamed House 1259 York St., Denver (1891) Wyman (Local Historic District)
 William L. Stevens House Denver (1891) Demolished
 McClair Apartments Denver (1892) Demolished
 Unnamed House 2149 High St., Denver 5DV2189 (1892)
 Unnamed House 1440 Vine St., Denver (1892) Demolished
 E.W. Williams Mansion 1440 Williams St., Denver (1892–93) Wyman Local Historic District
 Milheim House 1515 Race St., Denver 5DV4898 1893 Wyman
 Charles M. Kittredge House E. 8th Ave. & Oneida St., Denver (1893) Demolished
 Elks Lodge/Gold Mining Stock Exchange Cripple Creek 373–379 E. Bennett Ave., Cripple Creek 5TL2.5 1896 Cripple Creek Historic District 
 American National Bank, Leadville at Harrison Ave. & 5th St. in Leadville 5LK.40.24 1901 Leadville Historic District
 Marion Harper House 256 Bannock St. in Denver 5DV51.34Ba (1902) 
 Fire Station No. 15, Denver 1080 Clayton St., Denver 5DV5639 (1903) Local Landmark
 Hotel St. Regis 1540–44 Welton St. in Denver 5DV502 (1905) Demolished
 Adams County Courthouse 22 S. 4th Ave. in Brighton 5AM92 (1905–06)
Cheyenne County Courthouse at 51 S. First St. in Cheyenne Wells 5CH52 1908–09 Listed on the NRHP
 St. Thomas Theological Seminary 
 Washington County Courthouse at 150 Ash Ave. in Akron 5WN94 (1908–1910) Listed on the Colorado State Register of Historic Places
 Logan County Courthouse at 315 Main St., Sterling 5LO35 (1908–1910) Listed on the NRHP
 Summit County Courthouse at 208 E. Lincoln in Breckenridge 5ST130 (1909–10) in the Breckenridge Historical District
 Saguache County Courthouse at 504 Fourth St., Saguache 5SH1392 (1910) Listed on the State Register
 Elbert County Courthouse at 215 Commanche St. in Kiowa 5EL199 1912
Sterling City Hall at 214 Poplar St. in Sterling (1912)
 Akron High School Akron (1915) Demolished
 Sargent Consolidated School District – Elementary School Monte Vista vicinity 5RN689 (1917) State Register
 Filbeck Building 1527 Champa St., Denver 5DV489 (1917)
 Carnegie Library at 120 Jefferson St. in Monte Vista 5RN513 (1919) National Register Listed
 Queen of Heaven Orphanage at 4825 Federal Blvd. in Denver (1920) Demolished
 Sargent Consolidated School District – High School Monte Vista vicinity 5RN689 (1921) State Register Listed
 State Armory 300 Strong St., Brighton 5AM120 (1921)
 State Armory 363 Grand Ave., Delta 5DT440 (1921)
 State Armory (with Sidney Frazier) 614 8TH Ave., Greeley 5WL4108 (1921)
 Lincoln County Courthouse at 718 Third St., Hugo (1923) Demolished
 Edison Elementary School at 3350 Quitman St., in Denver 5DV635 (1925), a Denver Local Landmark
 Crested Butte High School at 5700 Maroon Ave. in Crested Butte 5GN3207 (1927)
 Custer County Courthouse at 205 S. 6th St. in Westcliffe (1929)
Fort Lupton Library 453 First St., Ft. Lupton (1929)

Undated Buildings:

 State Armory, Brush
 State Armory, Cañon City
 State Armory, Fort Collins
 State Armory, Fort Morgan
 State Armory, Fruita
 State Armory, Lamar
 State Armory, Manzanola
 State Armory, Pueblo
 Arcade Building, Denver
 Charles Boettcher House 1201 Grant St., Denver Demolished
 Paris Building, Denver
 Gus Holmes Building in Salt Lake City, Utah
 Bank of Montrose Montrose
 School Building Englewood
 School Building Durango
 Unknown Building Colorado Springs
 Unknown Building Grand Junction
 Unknown Building Rico

National Register-listed works
(with attribution that varies)

Adams County Courthouse, 22 S 4th Ave., Brighton, Colorado (Huddart, John James)
Canon City State Armory, 110 Main St., Canon City, Colorado (Huddart, John James)
Carnegie Library (Monte Vista, Colorado), 120 Jefferson St., Monte Vista, Colorado (Huddart, John J.)
Cheyenne County Courthouse, 51 S. 1st St., Cheyenne Wells, Colorado (Huddart, John James)
Creswell Mansion, 1244 Grant St., Denver, Colorado (Huddart, J.J.)
Deuel County Courthouse, 718 3rd St., Chappell, Nebraska (Huddart, John J.)
Fort Morgan State Armory, 528 State St., Fort Morgan, Colorado (Huddart, John J.)
Garden County Courthouse, F and Main Sts., Oshkosh, Nebraska (Huddart, John J.)
Lincoln School (Fort Morgan, Colorado), 914 State St., Fort Morgan, Colorado (Huddart, John J.)
Logan County Courthouse, Main St., Sterling, Colorado (Huddart, John J.)
Stanley School-Montclair School, 1301 Quebec St., Denver, Colorado (Huddart, John James)
State Armory, 590 Yampa Ave., Craig, Colorado (Huddart, John J.)
Toltec Club, 602 Magoffin Ave., El Paso, Texas (Huddart, J.J.)

References

Additional sources
Brettell, Richard R. Historic Denver: the Architects and the Architecture, 1858–1893. Denver: Historic Denver, Inc., 1973.
Hall, John. Hall's History of Colorado, vol. IV. Chicago: Blakely Printing Co., 1889.
Historic Denver News, v. 10 No. 10. October 1980.
Illustrated Denver – The Queen City of the Plains. Denver: Phoenix Publishing Co, 1893.
"John J. Huddart, Denver Architect, Dies at Age 72." Denver Post, 23 April 1930, p. 15.
Noel, Thomas J. Buildings of Colorado. New York: Oxford University Press, 1997.
Noel, Thomas J. and Barbara S. Norgren. Denver: The City Beautiful and its Architects, 1893–1941. Denver: Historic Denver, Inc., 1987.
Noel, Thomas J. and William J. Hansen. The Montclair Neighborhood. Denver: Historic Denver Inc., 1999.
Site Files Database, Office of Archaeology and Historic Preservation, Colorado Historical Society, Denver.
State Historic Preservation Offices, phone interviews conducted by Dale Heckendorn, Colorado
Historical Society:
Nebraska, 12 January 1998
Oklahoma, 12 January 1998
Utah, 12 January 1998
Wyoming, 13 January 1998
Student, Annette L. Historic Cheesman Park Neighborhood. Denver: Historic Denver Inc., 1999.
Wilk, Diane. The Wyman Historic District. Denver: Historic Denver Inc., 1995.

19th-century English architects
Architects from Preston, Lancashire
1856 births
1930 deaths
British emigrants to the United States
Architects from Denver
19th-century American architects
20th-century American architects